Margaret “Gretchen” Ustick (aka Countess Stoeffel; 1874 – June 19, 1928) was a Swiss-American actress.

Career
In 1919 Mrs. Wood founded the Art-O-Graf Film company of Denver, and she was on the board of directors. In 1920 Mrs. Wood was an actress in the films; Wolves of the Street and The Desert Scorpion.

Personal life and death
Mrs. Wood, as she was known, was born Margarita Gager in 1874, Vienna, Austria. She married a German national named Fischer and on December 22, 1896, in Todtmoos, Waldshut, Baden-Württemberg, Germany they had one child, Phillip Heinrich Carl Fischer. Margarita and Fischer divorced in 1900. Margarita returned home to Vienna and in 1898, with the help of Count Louis K. Stoeffel of the Arbon Castle at Lake Maggiore at Ticino, she regained custody of her son. She later married "Count" Stoeffel, and it was in Switzerland in 1900 that her son, Heinrich Carl Fischer, was abducted by his father's family.
Mrs. Wood was the first woman in Europe to attain a degree of doctor of medicine from the University of Vienna and permitted to practice abroad. She gained much fame thru her skill as a practicing physician and surgeon. And in 1917 she had a Colorado Delegation address Congress in an attempt to get the Defense Department to  make an exception and allow her to work as a physician for the United States Military in support of the war effort.
Mrs. Wood studied opera in Milan, Italy under Fritzi Scheff and gave concerts in Vienna, Milan and Paris.
After the death of "Count" Stoeffel, around 1909, Mrs. Wood married William O. Wood a wealthy Philadelphia businessman, who died in 1913. Together they owned land in Wyoming and in Colorado including the Wigwam Ranch in Jefferson County, Colorado later renamed the Flying G. Ranch and owned by Girl Scouts.
Edsel Ford made a stop at Mrs. Wood's Wigwam Ranch on July 1, 1915 as part of his Transcontinental Tour.
In 1919, Mrs. Wood founded the Art-O-Graf Film company of Denver, Colorado.
In 1919, Mrs. Wood was contacted by her son, Heinrich Carl Fischer, through the International Red Cross. He had been a German Officer and was wounded and thought to be dying, he asked the physicians to find his mother in America.
The mother and son were reunited February 11, 1922 in Denver.
In 1920 she was married to Herbert Henshall in Golden, Colorado whom she divorced only two years later. Then in 1923 she married Clark Henry Ustick, also in Golden, Colorado. She died June 19, 1928 in Los Angeles, California. Her son, Heinrich Carl Fischer changed his name to Harry Carl Fischer and worked for the Alexander Film Company as a cameraman.

References

External links

1874 births
1928 deaths
American film actresses
20th-century American actresses
Austro-Hungarian emigrants to the United States